Icebreaker: A Viking Voyage is a puzzle video game developed by Nitrome that was published by Rovio Entertainment under the Rovio Stars program.  However, as of April 2014 the game is published by Nitrome and is no longer published by Rovio Stars by mutual agreement.

The game contains the first episodes based on the flash game of the same title. The game was released on iOS in June 2013 and was released on Android in May 2014.

The storyline is that an icy wind has swept the Vikings away, leaving them stranded throughout the land and surrounded by deadly traps and dangerous enemies.  The player must rescue the Vikings by bringing them back to their longship.

Episodes

Gameplay 
Gameplay consists of cutting across objects such as ice, wood, stone or ropes in order to rescue the Vikings.

References 

2013 video games
Puzzle video games
Android (operating system) games
Fictional Vikings
IOS games
Video games set in the Viking Age
Video games based on Norse mythology
Video games developed in the United Kingdom
Rovio Entertainment games